The Altels (3,629 m) is a mountain of the Bernese Alps, located on the border between the Swiss cantons of Bern and Valais. It is situated in the Balmhorn massif, approximately halfway between Kandersteg and Leukerbad.

Although its south side is in Valais, the mountain lies within the Aar basin.

References

External links

Altels on Hikr

Mountains of Switzerland
Bernese Alps
Mountains of the Alps
Alpine three-thousanders
Mountains of Valais
Mountains of the canton of Bern
Bern–Valais border